USS Cincinnati (CL-6), was the third  light cruiser, originally classified as a scout cruiser, built for the United States Navy. She was the third Navy ship named after the city of Cincinnati, Ohio, the first being , an ironclad commissioned in 1862, during the Civil War, and the second being , a protected cruiser, that was decommissioned in 1919.

Cincinnati split her pre-war career between the Atlantic and the Pacific fleets. She served in the Scouting Fleet, based in the Atlantic, in 1924 to 1927, serving in the Pacific for a brief time in 1925 for fleet maneuvers.  Cincinnati joined the Asiatic Fleet in 1927, and returned to the Atlantic from 1928 to 1932. She continued to go back and forth between oceans until March 1941, when she was assigned to Neutrality Patrol in the western Atlantic.

When the United States entered World War II she was assigned to TF41, based at Recife, and used on convoy escort duties and patrols in the south Atlantic. In 1944, she sailed for the Mediterranean to support Operation Dragoon, the invasion of the south of France. After the war, she was deemed surplus and scrapped at the Philadelphia Naval Shipyard in February 1946.

Construction and design
Cincinnati was ordered on 29 August 1916, and contracted to be built by Todd Dry Dock and Construction Company, Tacoma, Washington, on 27 August 1917. Her keel was laid on 15 May 1920, and she was launched on 23 May 1921. She was sponsored by Mrs. Charles E. Tudor, wife of the Director of Safety of Cincinnati, having been designated by the Honorable John Galvin, Mayor of Cincinnati. Cincinnati was commissioned on 1 January 1924, Captain Charles P. Nelson in command.

Her crew, during peacetime, consisted of 29 officers and 429 enlisted men.

Cincinnati was powered by four Westinghouse geared steam turbines, each driving one screw, using steam generated by 12 Yarrow boilers.

Cincinnatis main armament went through many changes while she was being designed. Originally she was to mount ten /53 caliber guns; two on either side at the waist, with the remaining eight mounted in tiered casemates on either side of the fore and aft superstructures. After the United States entry into World War I the US Navy worked alongside the Royal Navy and it was decided to mount four 6-inch/53 caliber guns in two twin gun turrets fore and aft and keep the eight guns in the tiered casemates so that she would have an eight gun broadside and, due to limited arcs of fire from the casemate guns, four to six guns firing fore or aft. Her secondary armament consisted of two /50 caliber anti-aircraft (AA) guns in single mounts. She also carried two triple and two twin, above-water torpedo tube mounts for  torpedoes. The triple mounts were fitted on either side of the upper deck, aft of the aircraft catapults, and the twin mounts were one deck lower on either side, covered by hatches in the side of the hull. Cincinnati was also built with the capacity to carry 224 mines.

The ship lacked a full-length waterline armor belt. The sides of her boiler and engine rooms and steering gear were protected by three inches of armor. The conning tower and the deck over the machinery spaces and steering gear had one and a half inches of armor. The gun turrets were not armored and only provided protection against muzzle blast and splinter damage.
 

Cincinnati carried two floatplanes aboard that were stored on the two catapults. Initially these were Vought VE-9s, then Vought UO-1s, the ship then operated Curtiss SOC Seagulls from 1935, and Vought OS2U Kingfishers after 1940.

Armament changes
During her career Cincinnati went through several armament changes. Some of these changes were to reduce weight, but others were to increase her AA armament. On 8 September 1926, the Chief of Naval Operations, Admiral Edward W. Eberle, along with the Commanders in Chief of the United States Fleet and Battle Fleet, and their subordinate commanding officers, the Secretary of the Navy, Curtis D. Wilbur, ordered that all mines and the tracks for laying the mines be removed from all of the Omaha-class cruisers, the working conditions had been found to be very "wet". Another change made before the war was to increase the 3-inch guns to eight, all mounted in the ship's waist. After 1940, the lower aft 6-inch guns were removed and the casemates plated over for the same reason as the lower torpedo mounts. The ship's AA armament were originally augmented by three quadruple /75 gun mounts by early 1942, however, these didn't prove to be reliable and were replaced by twin  Bofors guns along with 14  Oerlikon cannons by the end of the war. It was reported that Cincinnati also mounted a pair of Army 40mm Bofors guns.

Service history

Inter-war period

Cincinnati began her career with the Scouting Fleet in operations along the eastern seaboard and the Caribbean, until February 1927, when transferred to duty in the Far East, based at Shanghai. This duty only lasted until April 1928, when she sailed for Newport, Rhode Island, and conducted operations along the east coast again, until 1932. Cincinnati left for the Pacific joining the Battle Force, with occasional trips to the east coast, until 1939, when she was again reassigned to Atlantic duty. 

On 12 February 1935, she rescued six members of the crew of the downed airship USS Macon.

World War II

Cincinnati transferred to Pearl Harbor in April 1940, sailing for Guam and the Philippines and conducting transport duty at the end of the year. After a year in the Pacific Cincinnati returned to the Atlantic to join her sister ships in the expanding neutrality patrols in the western Atlantic. After the United States entered the war, she continued patrolling, along with convoy escort duties, blockading the French fleet at Martinique, and searching for German blockade runners.
On 21 November 1942, along with her sister  and the destroyer , they spotted . The crew had begun to scuttle the ship, but the boarding party that had been dispatched was able to reach the ship and discover her true identity, a German blockade runner. They took the crew of 62 as prisoners, before she sank.
Cincinnati received an overhaul at New York, in early 1944, before serving as the escort flagship for three convoys crossing from New York to Belfast, Northern Ireland, from March 1944 to July 1944. She sailed for the western Mediterranean on 28 July, to assist with the assault on southern France, before again returning to New York for overhaul. She then joined the 4th Fleet at Recife, Brazil, on 17 November, and finished out the war in the European Theater patrolling the south Atlantic shipping lanes.

Cincinnati carried out two midshipmen training cruises during the summer of 1945. On 29 September, she arrived at Philadelphia, where a Board of Inspection and Survey recommended that she be taken out of commission. She was decommissioned 1 November 1945, and scrapped on 27 February 1946.

The ship's bell is in the lobby of the main branch of the Cincinnati Public Library.

Notable commanders

Awards
SOURCE
 Second Nicaraguan Campaign Medal
 Yangtze Service Medal
 American Defense Service Medal
 American Campaign Medal
 European–African–Middle Eastern Campaign Medal with one battle star
 World War II Victory Medal

References

Bibliography

Further reading
For film of Cincinnati, see the 1937 film, Submarine D-1.

External links

 

Omaha-class cruisers
Ships built in Tacoma, Washington
1921 ships
World War II cruisers of the United States
History of Cincinnati